The Brown Bears men's squash team is the intercollegiate men's squash team for Brown University located in Providence, Rhode Island. The team competes in the Ivy League within the College Squash Association. The university first fielded a varsity squash team in 1989. The current head coach is Stuart LeGassick.

Year-by-year results

Men's Squash 
Updated March 2020.

Players

Current roster 
Updated March 2020.

|}

See also
 List of college squash schools

References

External links 
 

 
College men's squash teams in the United States
Sports clubs established in 1930